Fulleda is a village in the comarca of Les Garrigues, in the province of Lleida, in Catalonia, Spain.

The population is about 115. The economy of the village is agrarian, with the cultivation on its unirrigated land of almonds, cereals, vineyard, olives, etc.

Fulleda is situated in the east of Les Garrigues, near the comarca of  Conca de Barberà, and about 40 kilometers from Lleida, the capital of the province of the same name.

References

External links 
Municipal website (catalan)
 Government data pages 

Municipalities in Garrigues (comarca)
Populated places in Garrigues (comarca)